Rădeşti may refer to several places in Romania:

 Rădeşti, a commune in Alba County
 Rădeşti, a commune in Galați County
 Rădeşti, a village in Almaș Commune, Arad County
 Rădeşti, a village in Stâlpeni Commune, Argeș County
 Rădeşti, a village in Oporelu Commune, Olt County
 Rădeşti, a village in Costeşti Commune, Vaslui County

See also 
 Radu (given name)
 Radu (surname)
 Rădulescu (surname)
 Răducan (surname)
 Răducanu (surname)
 Rădeni (disambiguation)
 Răduțești (disambiguation)
 Rădulești (disambiguation)